Free Weezy Album (abbreviated as FWA) is the eleventh studio album by American rapper Lil Wayne. It was released on July 4, 2015, by Young Money Entertainment and Republic Records, exclusively on TIDAL. It was released on Spotify and Apple Music on July 3, 2020, to commemorate its five-year anniversary, though some samples were changed due to clearance issues, and some tracks are absent completely.

Background
On December 4, 2014, just five days before Lil Wayne's Tha Carter V was due to be released, Wayne issued a statement saying the album would not be released on its expected release date, due to his displeasure with Cash Money Records label-boss Birdman, not wanting to release the album although it had been completed. Wayne also expressed his feelings by stating he felt both he and his creativity were "being held prisoner". On January 20, 2015, Wayne self-released Sorry 4 the Wait 2, a mixtape to compensate for the continued delay of Tha Carter V. It is the sequel to 2011's Sorry 4 the Wait, which served for the same purpose during the delay of his ninth album, Tha Carter IV (2011). Upon Sorry 4 the Wait 2s release, it was noted Wayne disses Birdman and Cash Money Records, several times throughout the mixtape. On January 28, 2015, it was reported Wayne filed a $51 million lawsuit against Birdman and Cash Money Records over the delay of Tha Carter V.

On the 5 year anniversary of the initial release, the album was made available on all streaming platforms in 2020. It included the bonus track "We Livin' Like That" but is missing original tracks "I Feel Good", "Thinking About You", "He's Dead" and "Without You". Additionally, many tracks had production changes to avoid sample clearance issues."

Release and promotion
In February 2015, due to Tha Carter Vs continuous delay, Wayne announced a Free Weezy Album, would be released prior to the fifth installment in his popular series. In June 2015, Wayne announced he joined fellow American rapper Jay-Z's TIDAL, as an artist owner, kicking off the partnership by exclusively releasing a single on the service titled "Glory". The album's cover art and  track-listing were unveiled on July 3, 2015. After the album was released on July 4, 2015, exclusively to TIDAL, Free Weezy Album had been streamed over 10 million times in first week of availability.

On July 3, 2020, the album was re-released on all platforms. In addition to this, multiple songs such as "Glory", "Pick Up Your Heart" and others were altered in order for sample clearances.

For the week of July 18, 2020, Free Weezy Album entered and peaked on the Billboard 200 chart at number 77.

Critical reception

 
The album received generally positive reviews from music critics. The Atlantic positively stated, "Free Weezy Album at first seems like pure swagger. But then you realize what's really on the rapper's mind" and critiqued the first  few tracks, although praised closer "Pick Up Your Heart".
HipHopDXs Ural Garrett enthusiastically said, "Free Weezy Album features both that lovely stream-of-consciousness lyricism and oddly refreshing conceptual themes that made him so worthwhile. Wayne sounds like he finally gets it." Uproxx wrote very favourably, "Free Weezy Album is proof Lil Wayne is on his way back" going on to say, "invigorated by his long, drawn-out dispute with Cash Money Records, Wayne seems to have new life in him on this impromptu project. For the first time since Tha Carter III, Wayne has put out a body of work that has inspired beats, as well as meaningful content", finishing the review with "Wayne has some kinks to continue to work out, but for an artist whose name was becoming more of a punchline with each release, FWA is a huge step forward."

Track listing

Notes
  signifies a co-producer.
 "He's Dead", "I Feel Good", "Thinking Bout You" and "Without You" are removed on Apple Music and Spotify.

Sample credits
"Glory" contains a sample from "Arise, Shine" performed by Greg Dykes and The Synanon Choir.
"He's Dead" contains a sample from "I See Ghost" performed by As Animals.
"I Feel Good" contains a sample from "I Got You (I Feel Good)" performed by James Brown.

Charts

Release history

References

2015 albums
Lil Wayne albums
Albums produced by Kane Beatz
Albums produced by Cool & Dre
Albums produced by London on da Track
Republic Records albums
Unauthorized albums